Ulrich van Gobbel (born 16 January 1971) is a Dutch Surinamese football coach and a former player who played as a defender for Feyenoord Rotterdam (where he had two spells), Galatasaray and Southampton. He works as a coach with the Under-19 squad of Feyenoord.

Career
At Southampton he scored two goals, with one coming against Lincoln City in the League Cup and one in the league against Leicester City.

He made eight international appearances for the Netherlands national team.

Honours

Feyenoord
KNVB Cup: 1990–91, 1991–92, 1993–94, 1994–95
Dutch Supercup: 1991, 1999
Eredivisie: 1992–93, 1998–99
UEFA Cup: 2001–02

Galatasaray
Turkish Cup: 1995–96
Süper Lig: 1996–97

Notes

References

External links

1971 births
Living people
Surinamese emigrants to the Netherlands
Sportspeople from Paramaribo
Dutch footballers
Association football defenders
Netherlands international footballers
1994 FIFA World Cup players
Eredivisie players
Premier League players
Willem II (football club) players
Feyenoord players
Galatasaray S.K. footballers
Southampton F.C. players
Süper Lig players
Dutch football managers
Dutch expatriate footballers
Dutch expatriate sportspeople in England
Expatriate footballers in England
Dutch expatriate sportspeople in Turkey
Expatriate footballers in Turkey